Harriet McEwen Kimball (November 2, 1834 – September 3, 1917) was an American poet, hymnwriter, philanthropist, and hospital co-founder. “The Poetess of the Church” as she was long called, Kimball's life was largely devoted to literature and to church work. She was one of that group of 19th—century poets of which Henry Wadsworth Longfellow was most prominent and which ministered so greatly to the American love of poetry and appreciation of it that the members of the group were in some sense literary pioneers. Kimball was the last of the group to survive.
 She died in 1917.

Early life and education
Harriet McEwen Kimball was born in Portsmouth, New Hampshire, on November 2, 1834. She is a daughter of Dr. David Kimball and Caroline Rebecca Swett. She was a delicate child, and her education was given to her in her own home, mainly by her cultured and accomplished mother. Kimball began to write at an early age, and her work was criticised by her parents, who encouraged her to develop and exercise her poetic gift.

Career
Kimball was interested in charitable work throughout her life, and Portsmouth Cottage Hospital is one of the monuments that attest to her philanthropy. She was an active church member.

In all her literary work, she was careful and painstaking. Her first volume of verse was published in 1867. In 1874, she published her Swallow Flights of Song, and in 1879, The Blessed Company of All Faithful People. In 1889, her poems were brought out in a full and complete edition. Most of her poems were religious in character. Many of them were hymns, and they were included in all church collections of the late 19th-century. Her devotional poems were models of their kind, and her work was considered unique in its rather difficult field. She lived in Portsmouth, devoted to her literary work, and her religious and philanthropic interests.

She was the author of Hymns, (Boston, 1866); Swallow Flights of Song, (1874). Her hymns included:— At times on Tabor's height (Faith arid Joy), Dear Lord, to Thee alone (Lent), It is an easy thing to say. (Humble Service), We have no tears, Thou wilt not dry (Affliction). She appeared in the Poets of Portsmouth (1864), and the Unitarian Hymns of the Spirit (1864), and others. Several of Kimball's poems were included in Robert Hall Baynes' The Illustrated Book of Sacred Poems.

Personal life
She was a friend of John Greenleaf Whittier. She died on September 3, 1917, at her home in Portsmouth, and was buried at Harmony Grove Cemetery, in the same city.

Selected works
Hymns (1866)
Swallow Flights of Song (1874)
The Blessed Company of All Faithful People (1879)
Poems (1889)

Lyrics

At This Thy Banquet, Lord of All
At Times on Tabor’s Height
Christ Is Risen!
Dawn of Dawns, the Easter Day
Day Is Ended, The
Dear Lord, to Thee Alone
For Easter Day, O Lilies White
Glory in the Highest
It Is an Easy Thing to Say
I’ve Heard Them Sing of Earthly Bowers
Jesus, the Ladder of My Faith
Sweeter to Jesus When on Earth
We Have No Tears Thou Wilt Not Dry
O Sad, Reproachful Face
Pour Thy Blessings, Lord, Like Showers
Speechless Sorrow Sat with Me
There Is but One True Way
There’s Rest on the Bosom of Jesus
This Is the Feast Time of the Year
To Him Who Hears I Whisper All
Wider and Wider Yet

References

Attribution

Bibliography

External links
 
 

1834 births
1917 deaths
19th-century American writers
19th-century American women writers
19th-century American philanthropists
19th-century American businesspeople
American women poets
American religious writers
Women religious writers
American hymnwriters
American health care businesspeople
People from Portsmouth, New Hampshire
Writers from New Hampshire
American women non-fiction writers
Burials in New Hampshire
Wikipedia articles incorporating text from A Woman of the Century